Paloma Moro (born 18 June 1982) is a Spanish gymnast. She competed at the 2000 Summer Olympics.

References

External links
 

1982 births
Living people
Spanish female artistic gymnasts
Olympic gymnasts of Spain
Gymnasts at the 2000 Summer Olympics
Gymnasts from Madrid
21st-century Spanish women